William Barret Ridgely (July 19, 1858 – April 30, 1920) was a United States Comptroller of the Currency from 1901 to 1908. 

William B. Ridgely attended Rensselaer Polytechnic Institute, where he was a member of the Chi Phi fraternity.  Upon his graduation from RPI in 1881, Ridgely engaged in mining, manufacturing, and banking in Illinois before President Theodore Roosevelt named him Comptroller in 1901. During his term, Congress passed legislation extending the corporate existence of the national banks for the second time. Ridgely resigned as Comptroller to accept the presidency of a national bank in Missouri, which had failed the previous year and was reorganized under his leadership.  In 1909 he returned to private business in the Eastern states.  

Ridgely died in Washington, D.C., on April 3, 1920.

References

Comptrollers in the United States
United States Comptrollers of the Currency
Rensselaer Polytechnic Institute alumni
1859 births
1920 deaths
Theodore Roosevelt administration personnel